The Billboard Music Award winners for Top Country Album. Recipients include Garth Brooks, Tim McGraw, Jason Aldean, Chris Stapleton, Taylor Swift, and Carrie Underwood. The most recent winner was Taylor Swift, for Red (Taylor's Version).

Winners and nominees

Most wins and nominations

The following individuals received two or more Top Country Album Awards:

The following individuals received two or more Top Country Album nominations:

References

Billboard awards
Album awards